The Castle Quarter (Hungarian: Várnegyed) refers to the part of Budapest located within the defensive walls of the Buda Castle complex, corresponding with the medieval royal city of Buda. Located on the Várhegy (Castle Mount), it is the oldest part of Budapest. 

The center of the quarter is the area between the Royal Palace and Matthias Church.

Notable sights

Viennese Gate

The "Bécsi kapu" (Vienna Gate) is one of the medieval gates of Buda. Today, it serves as an entrance to the district.

Buda Castle

The first fortress on Várhegy was built in the 13th century. Following the devastation during the Turkish occupation the whole building complex was reconstructed. It now it hosts some notable museums and other monuments, among them the national library.  Dísz tér (En: Dísz Square) can be found next to the complex. 

Matthias Church

A well-known church in the country. Its construction started around the same time as that of the castle. The sarcophagus of  Béla III of Hungary can be seen within the building. The square in front of the church is called Szentháromság tér (En: Holy Trinity Square).

Fisherman's Bastion

The bastion was built in the beginning of the 20th century. Its terrace provides a panorama view of the city.

Other notable monuments
 Baroque style apartments – the area was mainly populated after the Turkish occupation so most of the apartments carry the baroque stylistics of the 18th century, also what has been called late Rococo Zopfstil.
  – one of the main squares of the area with a nice view upon the town.  
  – the museum provides an overview upon the history of Hungarian military. 
 – the museum deals with the history of telecommunication. 
 Church of Mary Magdalene, Budapest
 
 
 Lutheran Church of Budavár
 National Archives of Hungary
 Hospital in the Rock - The site served as a shelter during the bombings; now it is an exhibition.

Gallery

References

External links
 WeLoveBudapest.com
 Budapestbylocals.com
 Lonelyplanet.com

Geography of Budapest
Buda Castle